Lorene Thomason Coates (born January 13, 1936) served as a Democratic member of the North Carolina General Assembly representing the U.S. state's seventy-seventh House district, including constituents in Rowan county from 2001 to 2011.

A retiree from Salisbury, North Carolina, she worked for the U.S. Department of Agriculture.  She has hosted a weekly radio show and for twenty years wrote a newspaper column in the Salisbury Post.

On March 30, 2006, she gained distinction by being the first Democratic member of the House to publicly call for House Speaker, and fellow Democrat, Jim Black to step down from his post as Speaker following investigations of his misconduct.  Black later resigned from the House and pleaded guilty to a felony charge of public corruption.

In 2007 she announced her support for John Edwards for President.

Electoral history

After redistricting, Coates' House District changed from 35 to 77.

References

External links

|-

Democratic Party members of the North Carolina House of Representatives
Women state legislators in North Carolina
Living people
People from Salisbury, North Carolina
American columnists
1936 births
21st-century American politicians
21st-century American women politicians
American women columnists